Diedra leuschneri is a species of moth of the family Tortricidae. It is found in the United States, where it has been recorded from California.

The moth is about 16 mm. Adults have been recorded on wing in May, September and October.

References

Moths described in 1999
Archipini